Stauchitz is a municipality in the district of Meißen, in Saxony, Germany.

Municipality subdivisions
Stauchitz includes the following subdivisions:

Bloßwitz
Dobernitz
Dösitz
Gleina
Groptitz
Grubnitz
Hahnefeld
Ibanitz
Kalbitz
Panitz
Plotitz
Pöhsig
Prositz
Ragewitz
Seerhausen
Staucha
Steudten
Stösitz
Treben
Wilschwitz

References 

Meissen (district)